U of SA, U. of SA, U of S.A., or U. of S.A. may refer to:
University of South Africa, in South Africa
University of Texas at San Antonio, in Texas
University of San Antonio, in Texas
University of St Andrews, in the United Kingdom
University of Saint Anthony, in the Philippines
Union of South Africa, the official name of South Africa from 1910 to 1961

See also
USA (disambiguation)